Max Black may refer to:

Max Black (1909–1988), British-American philosopher
Max Black (politician) (born 1936), Republican State Representative in Idaho
Max Black, character in TV show 2 Broke Girls

See also
Maxine Black (disambiguation)